Pieter Koen (born 8 March 1962) is a South African cricketer. He played in fifteen first-class and fourteen List A matches for Boland and Western Province from 1984/85 and 1991/92.

References

External links
 

1962 births
Living people
South African cricketers
Boland cricketers
Western Province cricketers
Cricketers from Paarl